Randy Starr (born Warren Nadel, July 2, 1930) is an American dentist and singer-songwriter known for writing twelve songs for Elvis Presley.

Early life
Starr was educated at Columbia University where he took his undergraduate degree from Columbia College in 1951, and his DDS degree from Columbia College of Dental Medicine in 1954.

Career
During the 1950s, he was a member of the American band The Islanders, whose "The Enchanted Sea" was the fifteenth most popular hit in 1959. Starr appeared on television on several occasions.  On August 21, 1957, he performed his hit song "After School" in one of his five appearances on American Bandstand. On September 10, 1962 he appeared as the real songwriting dentist on To Tell the Truth. Starr wrote songs that were recorded by Jackie Wilson, The Kingston Trio, Teresa Brewer, Nelson Riddle, Chet Atkins, Kay Starr, and Connie Francis.

Starr is retired and lives in New York City.

Presley songs

During the 1960s, Starr wrote twelve songs that were recorded by Elvis Presley.
 "Kissin' Cousins" was written with Fred Wise and was featured in the 1964 film Kissin' Cousins.
 "The Yellow Rose of Texas" was written with Fred Wise and was featured in the 1964 film Viva Las Vegas.
 "Carny Town" was written with Fred Wise and was featured in the 1964 film Roustabout.
 "Look Out Broadway" was written with Fred Wise and was featured in the 1966 film Frankie and Johnny.
 "Datin'" was written with Fred Wise and was featured in the 1966 film Paradise, Hawaiian Style.
 "Adam And Evil" was written with Fred Wise and was featured in the 1966 film Spinout.
 "Could I Fall In Love" and "Old MacDonald" were featured in the 1967 film Double Trouble.
 "Who Needs Money" and "The Girl I Never Loved" were featured in the 1967 film Clambake.
 "Almost in Love" was written with Luiz Bonfá and was featured in the 1968 film Live a Little, Love a Little.
 "I've Got News for You" was written with Fred Wise and was featured in the 1965 Elvis Presley film Girl Happy, sung by Shelly Fabares and Nita Talbot.

References

American male songwriters
American male singers
Singers from New York City
American dentists
1930 births
Living people
Columbia University College of Dental Medicine alumni
Columbia College (New York) alumni